The Cry Baby Killer is a 1958 teen exploitation film produced by Roger Corman that marked Jack Nicholson's film debut. The film was out of print and difficult to find until 2006, when it was issued on DVD for the first time by Buena Vista Home Entertainment as part of its Roger Corman Classics series.

Plot

Seventeen-year-old Jimmy Wallace panics after he thinks he has committed manslaughter while fighting with a group of teenage hoodlums. Wallace then takes a random man and woman, and the woman's infant, hostage inside a food shelter outside a popular local restaurant, and threatens them if they try to escape. This leads to a stand-off with a police force led by the sympathetic detective, Lieutenant Porter, who tries to avoid bloodshed. Meanwhile, an eager crowd of onlookers and a news reporter gather outside to see what will happen next.

Production
Corman later claimed that The Cry Baby Killer was the first film that he produced that did not return a profit, although he said that it earned back its from television rights. Corman also said that he had been abroad during preproduction while much of the script was changed by the producer. Corman returned to Hollywood two days before filming began and tried to reverse the changes, but was only partially successful.

Cast
Harry Lauter as Police Lt. Porter 
Jack Nicholson as Jimmy Wallace
Carolyn Mitchell as Carole Fields 
Brett Halsey as Manny Cole
Lynn Cartwright as Julie
Barbara Knudson as Mrs. Maxton 
William A. Forester as Carl Maxton 
John Shay as Police Officer Gannon 
Ralph Reed as Joey
Bill Erwin as Mr. Wallace
Ed Nelson as Rick Connor
Smoki Whitfield as Sam
John Weed as Police Sgt. Reed
Frank Richards as Pete Gambelli

See also
 List of American films of 1958

References

External links

 
 
 
 
 

1958 films
American black-and-white films
1950s crime thriller films
1950s English-language films
American independent films
American crime thriller films
Films scored by Gerald Fried
Films about juvenile delinquency
Allied Artists films
1950s independent films
Teensploitation
Films produced by Roger Corman
1950s American films
1958 directorial debut films